"Jigga My Nigga" is a single by Jay-Z from the Ruff Ryders Entertainment compilation Ryde or Die Vol. 1. It was released on May 28, 1999. It also appeared as a hidden track on Jay-Z's fourth album, Vol. 3... Life and Times of S. Carter, contained within the final track "Hova Song (Outro)". Produced by Swizz Beatz, it reached number 28 on the Billboard Hot 100. The song interpolates "Just You Just Me" by The Counts and "What's My Name?" by Snoop Dogg, using the line "what's my motherfuckin' name?". The beat was later remade for "Scenario 2000" by Eve featuring Ruff Ryders.

On the "Jigga My Nigga" CD single, three non-Jay-Z tracks are featured: Memphis Bleek's "Memphis Bleek Is...", Rell's "When You Will See" and Beanie Sigel's "What a Thug About".

Formats and track listings

CD
 "Jigga My Nigga (LP Version)" (5:23)
 "Memphis Bleek Is... (LP Version)" (4:19)
 "When You Will See (LP Version)" (4:47)
 "What a Thug About (LP Version)" (4:36)

Vinyl
A-side
 "Jigga My Nigga (Radio Edit)" (3:50)
 "Jigga My Nigga (LP Version)" (5:23)
 "Jigga My Nigga (Instrumental)"

B-side
 "What a Thug About (Radio Edit)"
 "What a Thug About (LP Version)"
 "What a Thug About (TV track)"

Charts

Weekly charts

Year-end charts

See also
List of songs recorded by Jay-Z

References

1999 singles
Jay-Z songs
Song recordings produced by Swizz Beatz
Songs written by Swizz Beatz
Songs written by Jay-Z
Roc-A-Fella Records singles
Def Jam Recordings singles
Hardcore hip hop songs
1998 songs